Dennis Havrilla (born August 24, 1987) is an American football quarterback who is currently a free agent. He signed as an undrafted free agent with the Arizona Adrenaline of the Indoor Football League (IFL) in 2011. He played college football at Western New Mexico University.

Professional career
Havrilla spent multiple years in the Indoor Football League (IFL), catching on with several teams while playing quarterback, safety and placekicker. In 2014, he began the season with the Dodge City Law before signing with the Arena Football League's Spokane Shock. After three weeks on the Shock's practice squad, Havrilla returned to the Law. Not long after his return to the Law, he was assigned to the San Jose SaberCats, where he appeared as a backup to Nathan Stanley. He was reassigned by the SaberCats on July 10, 2014.

Las Vegas Outlaws
On June 19, 2015, Havrilla was assigned to the Las Vegas Outlaws. He was the backup to J. J. Raterink, but when Raterink was pulled due to his ineffective play, Havrilla was thrust into the game. The following week against the Portland Thunder, Havrilla was named the starting quarterback. He led the Outlaws to a 48-46 victory, where he scored the game-winning touchdown on a one-yard rush. On August 3, 2015, Havrilla was placed on reassignment, one week before the season ended.

Cleveland Gladiators
On February 5, 2016, Havrilla was assigned to the Cleveland Gladiators. After Chris Dieker was injured in Week 1 of the 2016 season, Havrilla became the starting quarterback. However, he also later suffered an injury and Arvell Nelson replaced him as the starter.

High Country Grizzlies
On June 1, 2017, Havrilla signed with the High Country Grizzlies. He played in one game for the Grizzlies, completing 16 of 37 passes for 282  yards, 5 touchdowns and 3 interceptions.

AFL statistics

Stats from ArenaFan:

References

External links
 Western New Mexico bio
 Arena Football League bio
 

1987 births
Living people
American football quarterbacks
Nebraska–Kearney Lopers football players
Western New Mexico Mustangs football players
Bricktown Brawlers players
Arizona Adrenaline players
Lehigh Valley Steelhawks players
Arizona Outlaws (AIF) players
Dodge City Law players
Spokane Shock players
San Jose SaberCats players
Las Vegas Outlaws (arena football) players
Cleveland Gladiators players
Diablo Valley Vikings football players
High Country Grizzlies players